Maja Perinović (born 24 September 1999) is a Croatian racing cyclist, who currently rides for UCI Women's Continental Team . She rode in the women's road race event at the 2018 UCI Road World Championships.

References

External links

1999 births
Living people
Croatian female cyclists
Sportspeople from Zadar